The 1998 World Series of Poker (WSOP) was a series of poker tournaments held at Binion's Horseshoe.

Preliminary events

Main Event
There were 350 entrants to the main event. Each paid $10,000 to enter the tournament. The 1998 Main Event was notable for having only five players reach the official final table for the first time in WSOP Main Event history.

Final table

*Career statistics prior to the beginning of the 1998 Main Event.

Final table results

Other High Finishes
NB: This list is restricted to top 30 finishers with an existing Wikipedia entry.

External links
1998 World Series of Poker at Conjelco.com

World Series of Poker
World Series of Poker